The Tattersall's Club Tiara is a Tattersall's Racing Club Group 1 Thoroughbred horse race held under Weight for Age conditions, for fillies and mares aged three years old and upwards, over a distance of 1400 metres at Eagle Farm Racecourse, Brisbane, Australia in June.  Total prizemoney for the race is A$700,000.

History

The race was first run in 1989 and was known as the Winter Stakes until 2011.

Grade
1992–1995 - Listed Race
1996–2005 - Group 3
 2006 - Group 2
2007 onwards Group 1

This race is the final Group 1 race of the season in Australia.

Distance
1989–2006 –  1500 metres
2007–2016 – 1400 metres
2017 onwards - 1350 metres

Venue
Due to track reconstruction of Eagle Farm Racecourse for the 2014–15 racing season the event was  transferred to Gold Coast Racecourse.
 2017 - Doomben Racecourse
 2018 - Doomben Racecourse
 2019 onwards - Eagle Farm Racecourse

Winners

 2022 - Startantes
 2021 - Tofane
 2020 - ‡race not held
 2019 - Invincibella
 2018 - Prompt Response
 2017 - Tycoon Tara
 2016 - Miss Cover Girl
 2015 - Srikandi
 2014 - Cosmic Endeavour
 2013 - Red Tracer
 2012 - Pear Tart
 2011 - Yosei
 2010 - Melito
 2009 - Russeting
 2008 - Absolut Glam
 2007 - Nova Star
 2006 - La Sizeranne
 2005 - Charmview
 2004 - Miss Potential
 2003 - Mon Mekki
 2002 - Heptonstall
 2001 - Porto Roca
 2000 - Bonanova
 1999 - Bonanova
 1998 - Razor Blade
 1997 - Dane Ripper
 1996 - Tripping
 1995 - Mamzelle Pedrille 
 1994 - Zetoile 
 1993 - Rich Pageantry
 1992 - Blushing Bijou
 1991 - Rose Road
 1990 - Piper's Belle
 1989 - La Posette

‡ Not held because of the COVID-19 pandemic

See also
 List of Australian Group races
 Group races

References

Group 1 stakes races in Australia
Mile category horse races for fillies and mares
Sport in Brisbane